St. Richard's Manor is a historic home located at Lexington Park, St. Mary's County, Maryland. It is a -story Flemish bond brick dwelling, with a steeply pitched gable roof, constructed before 1750 on the Patuxent River. Also on the property are two tobacco barns built about 1935, and a small pyramid-roofed concrete block pumphouse.

On December 16, 1652, "St. Richard's Manor" was re-patented to Luke Gardiner, heir of Richard Gardiner, because the original patent had been lost as a result of the internal strife with Ingle in 1645.  Shortly afterwards /_that is in the 1650s _/ Richard Edelen was contracted by Luke to build a second house on the Manor.  This house is still standing today on fifty-five acres of the original land patent.  Richard Edelen built a second house called "Riverview"  (circa 1659) for Luke Gardiner near St. Clements Island. When bequeathing St. Richard's manor, Richard Keene stated "which was taken up in Luke Gardiner's name." This leads one to conclude that Luke Gardiner was given manorial rights and therefore when Richard Keene became possessed of the manor the rights and privileges of Court Baron became vested in Richard Keene as Lord of St. Richard's Manor.

St. Richard's Manor was listed on the National Register of Historic Places in 1985.

References

External links
, including photo from 1976, at Maryland Historical Trust

Houses completed in 1798
Houses on the National Register of Historic Places in Maryland
Houses in St. Mary's County, Maryland
Georgian architecture in Maryland
National Register of Historic Places in St. Mary's County, Maryland